Richard Percy Lewis (10 March 1874 – 7 September 1917) was an English first-class cricketer active 1891–1907 who played for Middlesex, Oxford University and Marylebone Cricket Club (MCC). He was born in Kensington and died on active World War I service at Zonnebeke, West Flanders, Belgium.

Lewis was educated at Winchester College and University College, Oxford. After leaving Oxford he was briefly editor of the London Review, but at the outbreak of the South African War he joined the army. He served in South Africa and was commissioned in the Devonshire Regiment. He transferred to the King's African Rifles in 1904, then to the Egyptian Army in 1908. After the outbreak of World War I he transferred to the Manchester Regiment and held the rank of lieutenant-colonel commanding the 10th battalion when he was killed.

References

1874 births
1917 deaths
English cricketers
Military personnel from London
Middlesex cricketers
Oxford University cricketers
Marylebone Cricket Club cricketers
Gentlemen cricketers
People educated at Winchester College
Alumni of University College, Oxford
Devonshire Regiment officers
British Army personnel of the Second Boer War
British Army personnel of World War I
Manchester Regiment officers
British military personnel killed in World War I
A. Priestley's XI cricketers
Gentlemen v Players
A. J. Webbe's XI cricketers
Oxford University Past and Present cricketers
King's African Rifles officers
Egyptian military officers